Hamed al-Nazir (born 1975), also spelled Hamid el-Nazir, is a Sudanese journalist and novelist.

al-Nazir graduated from Omdurman Ahlia University with a bachelor's degree in Business Management. He has since worked as a broadcaster for the Sudanese Al-Shorouk channel, a news reporter for the MBC channel from Sudan, and a commentator for the Sudanese Blue Nile Channel and Sudanese Radio. He currently works for Alaraby TV as News Presenter. He was working for Qatar TV.

al-Nazir has published four acclaimed novels in Arabic. Several of his novels have been longlisted for the International Prize for Arabic Fiction. An excerpt in English translation of his novel The Waterman's Prophecy was included in Banipal magazine's spring issue on Sudanese Literature Today in 2016.

Selected works
"Freej Al Marar" 2014, which won the 2014 Sharjah Prize for Arab Creativity, and the 2014 Qatar Vodafone Prize for the Novel.
 The Waterman's Prophecy 2015, which was longlisted for the International Prize for Arabic Fiction in 2016.
 The Black Peacock 2017, which is also longlisted for the International Prize for Arabic Fiction in 2018.
 Green Eyes 2020, based on Mariam Ibrahim story and was longlisted for the International Prize for Arabic Fiction 2021.

See also 
 Sudanese literature
 List of Sudanese writers
 The Waterman's Prophecy
 International Prize for Arabic Fiction

References

Sudanese literature
Sudanese novelists
1975 births
Living people